Hochschule für die Wissenschaft des Judentums, or Higher Institute for Jewish Studies, was a rabbinical seminary established in Berlin in 1872 and closed down by the Nazi government of Germany in 1942. Upon the order of the government, the name was officially changed (1883–1923 and 1933–42) to Lehranstalt für die Wissenschaft des Judentums.

History 
Abraham Geiger, who had been active in establishing Reform Judaism, wanted a university for Jewish studies in Berlin. Unable to become part of the University of Berlin, he was involved in 1870 in creating a separate institution. Also involved were David Cassel, Israel Lewy, Moritz Lazarus and Heymann Steinthal, the Jewish "intellectuals" and professors at the University of Berlin.

Geiger's "General Introduction to the Science of Judaism," "Introduction to the Biblical Writings" and "Lectures on Pirḳe Abot" were originally delivered as lectures at the seminary. Some of the best German-Jewish teachers taught there in the spirit of the Wissenschaft des Judentums movement: Hanoch Albeck, Ismar Elbogen, Julius Grünthal, Julius Guttmann, Franz Rosenthal, Harry Torczyner, and Leo Baeck.

Officially the institution was not affiliated with a movement or denomination. It sought free inquiry and research without any restrictions. It stood for a conservative Judaism, but its main object was the scientific study of things Jewish, freed as far as possible from denominational disputes. There was no religious test for professors but it was assumed that all of the faculty lived according to the Jewish tradition and were fluent in Hebrew. As the school was never dependent on any religious or public organization, the board was constantly engaged in raising money from wealthy contributors, sponsors of scholarly "chairs" and scholarships.

In 1872, the first year, there were only 12 students, including four women. In 1921, there were 63 full-time and 45 part-time students enrolled in the Hochschule. Many of the students came from Eastern European countries, notably Poland, as graduates of Orthodox Yeshivot. By 1930–33 the school had achieved so great a reputation that many non-Jews, especially Christian clergy, enrolled.

Notable alumni
Leo Baeck (1873–1956) as a student 1894–95; as a lecturer 1913–42. Baeck was a rabbi, scholar and theologian. He served as leader of Reform Judaism in his native country and internationally, and later represented all German Jews during the Nazi era. After the Second World War, he settled in London, UK, where he served as the chairman of the World Union for Progressive Judaism.
Arthur Biram (1878–1967), philosopher, philologist, and educator, who emigrated to Ottoman Palestine in 1913
Aron Brand (1910– 1977) who became a pediatric cardiologist in Israel, where he founded the Jerusalem Academy of Medicine
Mordecai Ehrenpreis
Emil L. Fackenheim
Abraham Joshua Heschel
 Ellen Littmann
Regina Jonas
Alice Lucas
Philip Magnus
 Arno Nadel
Claude Montefiore
Samuel Poznanski
Herman Schaalman (1916–2017), who became senior rabbi at the Emanuel Congregation of Chicago and also an interfaith activist 
Solomon Schecter
Shmaryahu Levin (1867–1935), Zionist activist. He was a member of the first elected Russian Parliament for the Constitutional Democratic Party in 1906.
Selma Stern  (1890–1981), one of the first women in Germany to become a professional historian; a research fellow at the Akademie für die Wissenschaft des Judentums which was founded at the Hochschule in 1919
Manfred Swarsensky (1905–1981), who graduated from the Hochschule with a PhD in 1929. He was rabbi, for 36 years, at Temple Beth El, a Reform synagogue in Madison, Wisconsin.
Israel Taglicht (1862−1943), Chief Rabbi of Vienna
Werner van der Zyl (1902–1984), who became a rabbi in Berlin and in London, where he was the prime mover and first director of studies of what was to become the Leo Baeck College
Miriam Yalan-Shteklis (1900–1984), writer and poet

References

Further reading
 Lehranstalt für die Wissenschaft des Judenthums: Rückblick auf die ersten fünfundzwanzig Jahre (1872–97), Berlin, 1897.
 Seidel, Esther (2002). Women Pioneers of Jewish Learning: Ruth Liebrecht and Her Companions at the 'Hochschule für die Wissenschaft des Judentums' in Berlin 1930–1934, Jüdische Verlagsanstalt Berlin. .

External links
Popular article on the history of the institution

 Bookstamp of the Bibliothek der Hochschule für die Wissenschaft des Judentums (Rare Books of the Shimeon Brisman Collection in Jewish Studies, Washington University)
 Bookstamp of the Bibliothek der Lehranstalt für die Wissenschaft des Judentums (Rare Books of the Shimeon Brisman Collection in Jewish Studies, Washington University)

1872 establishments in Germany
1942 disestablishments in Germany
Hochschule fur die Wissenschaft des Judentums
Educational institutions established in 1872
Jewish German history
Jewish seminaries
Jews and Judaism in Berlin
Judaic studies
Hochschule fur die Wissenschaft des Judentums
Educational institutions disestablished in 1942